Structural stage theories are based on the idea that human individuals or groups can develop through a pattern of distinct stages over time and that these stages can be described based on their distinguishing characteristics. Types of structural stage theories include: in psychology, developmental stage theories such as Piaget's theory of cognitive development and theories of psychotherapy process such as the transtheoretical model of change; in history and social science, stadial history of sociocultural evolution; and in religion, models of spiritual evolution.

In Piaget's theory of cognitive development, and related models of psychological development like those of Jane Loevinger and James W. Fowler, stages have a constant order of succession, later stages integrate the achievements of earlier stages, and each is characterized by a particular type of structure of mental processes which is specific to it. The time of appearance may vary to a certain extent depending upon environmental conditions.

Influenced by western esotericism, Swami Vivekananda and Sri Aurobindo regarded spiritual development as a process of involution and evolution, in which the Divine descends into the material world, from which it has to be liberated again in a process of growing awareness over multiple lifetimes. Cultural psychologist Jean Gebser also developed a model of collective human spiritual development, which in turn influenced Ken Wilber, together with Aurobindo and others.

List of books formulating stage theories
Giambattista Vico (1725) The New Science
G.W.F. Hegel (1807) The Phenomenology of Spirit
Auguste Comte's Law of three stages in Plan de travaux scientifiques nécessaires pour réorganiser la société (Plan of scientific studies necessary for the reorganization of society, 1822)
Karl Marx (1867) Das Kapital
Sigmund Freud (1900) The Interpretation of Dreams
Jean Piaget (1950) The psychology of intelligence
Northrop Frye (1957) Anatomy of Criticism
Hayden White (1973) Metahistory
Jane Loevinger (1976) Loevinger's stages of ego development
Clare W. Graves (1978/2005) The Never Ending Quest (posthumously published in the later year listed, primarily written by the earlier year)
Kieran Egan (1979) Educational Development
Ken Wilber (1995) Sex, Ecology, Spirituality

See also
Alexander Fraser Tytler
End-of-history illusion
History of ideas
Integrative level
Recapitulation theory

References 

Philosophy of science